Benjamin Collins (born 4 November 1977) is an English cricketer. He played eighteen first-class matches for Cambridge University Cricket Club between 1998 and 2001.

See also
 List of Cambridge University Cricket Club players
 List of Cambridge UCCE & MCCU players

References

External links
 

1977 births
Living people
English cricketers
Cambridge University cricketers
People from Marylebone
Hertfordshire cricketers
Cambridge MCCU cricketers